Max Mirnyi and Daniel Nestor were the defending champions, but chose not to compete together. Mirnyi competed with Horia Tecău, but lost in the second round to Michaël Llodra and Nicolas Mahut, while Nestor competed with Robert Lindstedt, losing in the second round to Jonathan Dasnières de Veigy and Florent Serra.

Bob and Mike Bryan won the title, defeating Llodra and Mahut in the final, 6–4, 4–6, 7–6(7–4). With this victory they earned their first multiple career Grand Slam set as a team.

Seeds

Main draw

Finals

Top half

Section 1

Section 2

Bottom half

Section 3

Section 4

References 
 Main Draw
2013 French Open – Men's draws and results at the International Tennis Federation

Men's Doubles
French Open by year – Men's doubles